Phoeniconaias is a genus of birds in the flamingo family Phoenicopteridae. The genus contains one extant species, the lesser flamingo (Phoenicopterus minor) occurring in sub-Saharan Africa and western India, and an extinct species Phoeniconaias proeses from the Pliocene of Australia which is thought to have been even smaller.

References 

Phoeniconaias
Bird genera
Taxa described in 1869
Taxa named by George Robert Gray